Dipotamia (before 1927: Ρέβανη - Revani) is a village in Kastoria Regional Unit, Macedonia, Greece.

Revani was populated by Albanian speaking Muslim inhabitants and they used to intermarry with the nearby Muslim villages of Menkulas, Vidohovë and Miras (now in Albania). The Greek census (1920) recorded 721 people in the village and in 1923 there were 673 inhabitants (or 85 families) who were Muslim. Following the Greek-Turkish population exchange, the Muslim population of Revani went to Turkey in 1924 and Anatolian Orthodox Christians settled in the village. In 1926, 130 refugee families from Pontus were in Revani. The Greek census (1928) recorded 468 inhabitants. There were 128 refugee families (493 people) in 1928. After the population exchange, the site where the village mosque stood was replaced by the present church, the Assumption of the Virgin, built in 1925.

References

Populated places in Kastoria (regional unit)